Fauna of Portugal may refer to:
 List of birds of Portugal
 List of mammals of Portugal

See also
 Outline of Portugal